Korreh Siah-e Shirin (also Romanized as Korreh Sīāh-e Shīrīn and Koreh Sīāh-e Shīrīn) is a village in Dodangeh Rural District, in the Central District of Behbahan County, Khuzestan Province, Iran. At the 2006 census, its population was 185, in 41 families.

References 

Populated places in Behbahan County